Slavic Party (Slovianska Partiya) is a political party of Ukraine, previously known as Civil Congress of Ukraine (Civil Union).

Historical background

Creation of Civil Congress (assembly)
On March 21, 1992 in Kharkiv took place a consultative meeting of some politicians from eastern regions of Ukraine. At the meeting it was decided to create a new political power. For that reason on May 16 in Donetsk under leadership of Mykola Azarov was conducted a congress that adopted the name of future organization - Civil Congress of Ukraine (Grazhdanskiy Kongress Ukrainy; GKU), an assembly of Russophone population of Ukraine. The congress elected provisional co-chairmen GKU Oleksandr Bazyliuk (leader of "Movement for revival of Donbas"), Valeriy Meshcheriakov (MP), and Mykola Ragozin (leader of "Democratic Donbas"). Members of the provisional working presidium became Anatoliy Volchenko (Kharkiv division of the "Movement of democratic reforms"), Pavlo Khaimovych (Public organization "Elections 89"), Dmytro Kornilov (Interfront of the Donbass), Oleksandr Luzan ("Civil forum of Ukraine"), and Vladislav Karabulin (Don Cossacks).

On October 3, 1992 in Donetsk under the leadership of Pavlo Khaimovych took place the second congress where was officially created the Civil Congress of Ukraine. Co-chairmen of the GKU became Oleksandr Bazyliuk (Movement for revival of Donbas), and parliamentarians Valeriy Meshcheriakov and Volodymyr Terekhov. It also was decided that based on the congress to create two political parties: economically oriented Party of Labor and its political ally - Civil Union (headed by Oleksandr Bazyliuk). During the congress a more radical group ceded away and created the Party of Slavic Unity of Ukraine (Russian National Unity, Slavic Union, National Alliance of Russian Solidarists, others). At the constituent congress of GKU were represented following organizations:
 Civil forum (served as foundation for GKU)
 Motherland forum
 Slavic Union
 Patriotic Club "Rodina" (Motherland)
 National Alliance of Russian Solidarists
 remnants and numerous org-committees, associations and communities of Russophone population

Creation of Civil Congress (party)
With time Party of Labor distanced itself from the Civil Union and the last was left in GKU de facto by itself. On June 10, 1993 the Civil Union was officially registered as a political party under the name of Civil Congress of Ukraine. Main program of GKU was emphasized in four main points:
 Bilateral relations with the Russian Federation and other states about dual citizenship
 Preservation of broadcasting television programs from Ostnkino and RTR
 Granting the Russian language a status of the second state language
 Reinforcement of the Commonwealth of Independent States

On September 18, 1993 in Kyiv took place the third congress of GKU led by Oleksandr Bazyliuk.

On December 18–19, 1993 in Kharkiv took place the fourth congress of GKU in order to nominate candidates of parliamentarians for the 1994 Ukrainian parliamentary election. At the congress the ideology of the party was identified as left-centrist. During the elections only two candidates were successful: Volodymyr Alekseyev (Electoral district 369, Industrial) and Yuriy Boldyriov (Electoral district 112, Kirovsk-Shakhtarsk). Both of them, however, oscillated from GKU after being elected.

At the 1994 Presidential elections GKU supported both Leonid Kuchma and Oleksandr Moroz and at the second round - Leonid Kuchma.

On November 5–6, 1994 in Donetsk took place the fifth congress of GKU at which Bazyliuk was reelected as the party's leader. On April 22, 1995, after the reaction in Crimea and exile of Yuriy Meshkov to Moscow, in Simferopol took place the seventh congress of the Republican Party of Crimea, which adapted decision about self-liquidation and proposed its members to join the Civil Congress of Ukraine.

On March 16, 1996 GKU actively supported the creation of the Congress of Russian Organizations of Ukraine in Kyiv which was headed by Oleksandr Bazyliuk. The next day in Kyiv took place the sixth congress of GKU. On May 24, 1997 at the seventh congress of GKU Bazyliuk was reelected as the leader of GKU.

For the 1998 Ukrainian parliamentary elections the party along with the Ukrainian Party of Justice joined the Electoral bloc "Laborious Ukraine" (not to be confused with Serhiy Tihipko's parties Labour Ukraine or Labour Party Ukraine). The party list was headed by the General Ivan Herasymov. The elections were not successful for the "Laborious Ukraine" as it did not manage to obtain any seats in Verkhovna Rada.

Slavic Party
On April 26, 1998 in Donetsk took place the eighth congress where GKU was officially renamed as the Slavic Party.

On May 15, 1999 in Donetsk took place the ninth congress of Slavic Party, which nominated Oleksandr Bazyliuk as a candidate to President of Ukraine. At the 1999 presidential elections Bazyliuk place second to last.

It is currently a member of the Left Opposition.

Results

References

External links
Volodymyr Alekseyev, profile on website of the Verkhovna Rada
Yuri Boldyriov, profile on website of the Verkhovna Rada
Political parties of Ukraine
Political Ukraine today
Party self-liquidation in Ukraine
Electoral bloc of parties "Laborious Ukraine"
Electoral bloc of political parties "For Union"
Elections to the Kyiv city council
Kharkiv office of the Slavic Party

1992 establishments in Ukraine
Organizations established in 1992
Pan-Slavism
Political parties established in 1993
Political parties in Ukraine
Russian nationalist parties
Russian political parties in Ukraine